Jow Kham is a village in Badakhshan Province in north-eastern Afghanistan. The village lies on the banks of a similarly named stream about 10 miles from Eskan.

References

Populated places in Yamgan District